Kingdom Crusade (known as The Legend of Prince Valiant  in Europe) is a Game Boy strategy video game released in 1991 in the PAL regions and 1992 in North America.

Summary

The game takes places during a hypothetical apocalyptic battle between a dark, evil army and a light, good army. Even the king and queen of each respective kingdom are expected to contribute to combat duty; which was expected of kings in the Middle Ages but not of most queens.

Even though this game is medieval in nature, it does not depict any cultures of Medieval Europe against each other. Players can take either side and both kingdom's units are of equal strength to each other. The units in the game correspond to Western high fantasy (i.e., paladins instead of samurai). All fighting is done in an arcade manner (real-time with button mashing) rather than a typical manner of a strategy or role-playing game (either turn-based or real-time without button mashing).

Each player must either destroy all of the opponent's units or capture all the castles in order to defeat the opponent and win the game. Winning results in a celebration screen while losing is the equivalent to a game over.

Reception
Allgame gave this video game a score of 2.5 points out of a possible 5 in their overview. Power Unlimited gave the game a score of 62% writing: "The idea behind Prince Valiant is nice. Some strategy, mixed with the knightly feel. But in practice, this rarely happens. It is unclear what exactly should be done, and there is far too little action."

References

See also
 Archon: The Light and the Dark, which plays in a similar fashion to this video game

1991 video games
Electro Brain games
Game Boy games
Game Boy-only games
Fantasy video games set in the Middle Ages
Ocean Software games
Turn-based tactics video games
Multiplayer and single-player video games
Video games developed in the United States
Video games set in castles